Paraamblyptilia is a genus of moths in the family Pterophoridae.

Species
Paraamblyptilia eutalanta (Meyrick, 1931)
Paraamblyptilia ridouti Gielis, 1996

Platyptiliini
Moth genera
Taxa named by Cees Gielis